Stian Westerhus (born 2 April 1979) is a Norwegian guitarist known for his experimental style, explored with keyboardist Øystein Moen in the bands Jaga Jazzist and Puma and with Sidsel Endresen, Nils Petter Molvær, Arve Henriksen, Jan Bang, and Ingar Zach.

Career

Westerhus holds a bachelor in jazz from Middlesex University under Stuart Hall, and a master from the Jazz program at Trondheim Musikkonservatorium, (NTNU, 2005).

He was first recognised by a broader audience within the experimental jazz band Puma, with whom he released four albums. The soloalbum Pitch Black Star Spangled (2010) on Rune Grammofon got some attention in reviews.

The album Didymoi Dreams (2012) is his debut as a duo with experimental jazz singer Sidsel Endresen, a meeting of experience insane guitar rhythms with a gibberish vocal world. They have been of great inspiration to new experimental Norwegian musicians like Natalie Sandtorv and Torgeir Standal in The Jist duo.

Gallery

Honors
Spellemannprisen 2012, in the class Jazz together with Sidsel Endresen, for the album Didymoi Dreams

Discography

Solo albums
2009: Galore (Rune Grammofon/The Last Record Company)
2010: Pitch Black Star Spangled (Rune Grammofon)
2012: The Matriarch and the Wrong Kind of Flowers (Rune Grammofon)
2016: Amputation (House of Mythology)

Collaborations
With Puma
2007: Isolationism (Bolage Records)
2008: Discotheque Bitpunching (Bolage Records)
2009: Fist Full of Knuckles with Lasse Marhaug (Knuckleman Records)
2010: Half Nelson Courtship (Rune Grammofon)

With Fraud
2007: Fraud (The Babel Labell UK)

With Terje Isungset
2008: Laden With Rain (FMR Records)
2015: Terje Isungset & Stian Westerhus (All Ice Records)

With Monolithic
2009: Black Science (RoggBif/Vendlus)

With Bladed
2009: Mangled Dreams (Crispin Glover Records)

With Eldbjørg Raknes and Eirik Hegdal
2009: From Frozen Feet Heat Came (MyRecordings)

With Sidsel Endresen
2012: Didymoi Dreams (Rune Grammofon)

With BOL
2012: Numb, Number (Gigafon)

With Pale Horses
2014: Maelstrom (Rune Grammofon), as Stian Westerhus & Pale Horses

With Ulver
2017: The Assassination of Julius Caesar (House of Mythology)

As producer
2010: Eldbjørg Raknes - Sense (MyRecordings)
2011: PELbO - Days of Transcendence (Riot Factory)
2012: Nils Petter Molvær - Baboon Moon (Sula Records)

Awards and scholarships
 2010 - Sparebank 1 SNM's jazz scholarship awarded at Moldejazz.
 2008 - BBC’s Award for Innovation in Jazz with Fraud (UK)
 2007 - Sparebank 1 SNM's jazz talent scholarship awarded at Moldejazz
 2007 - Ronnie Scott's Award for Best Newcomer 2007 (UK) with Fraud
 2006 - Trondheim Jazz Festival's talent prize with Bladed
 2006 - Moldejazz's young jazz musician of the year with Puma

References

External links 
 
 Live session for BBC at YouTube
 Album review from Allaboutjazz

Jaga Jazzist members
1979 births
Living people
People from Steinkjer
Norwegian University of Science and Technology alumni
Rune Grammofon artists
Avant-garde jazz guitarists
Norwegian jazz guitarists
Norwegian jazz composers
Puma (band) members
FMR Records artists